Ticocystiscus is a genus of minute sea snail, a marine gastropod mollusc in the family Cystiscidae.

This genus, and indeed all the genera in the family, were previously and sometimes still are, placed in the family Marginellidae.

Species 
 Ticocystiscus iberia Espinosa & Ortea, 2002 - type species

References 

Cystiscidae